Semisonic is an American rock band formed in Minneapolis in 1995, consisting of Dan Wilson (lead vocals, guitar, keyboards), John Munson (bass, keyboards, backing vocals, guitar), and Jacob Slichter (drums, percussion, keyboards, backing vocals). They are best known in the U.S. for their 1998 single "Closing Time". They also had international success with the singles "Singing in My Sleep", "Secret Smile" and "Chemistry".

History

Formation and debut album
After the breakup of Trip Shakespeare, Dan Wilson, and John Munson joined up with drummer Jacob Slichter to form Semisonic in 1995. An EP, Pleasure, was released that year on Boston indie label CherryDisc, and the studio full-length Great Divide in 1996 on MCA.

Breakthrough and international success
Semisonic's breakthrough came two years later in 1998 when their second album, Feeling Strangely Fine, reached the Top 50 chart on the strength of the hit single "Closing Time", their biggest hit in the United States. In a 2008 performance at Harvard's Sanders Theatre, Wilson made it known that it was originally written about the birth of his first child.

Their international career also blossomed when another song from the album, "Secret Smile", quickly became a UK radio favourite in the summer of 1999, eventually peaking at No. 12 on the UK Singles Chart.

Third album and hiatus
In early 2001, the band released its third album, All About Chemistry, The single "Chemistry" was a mainstay overseas; however the album did not fare as well in the United States. Another song, "Over My Head", was used in the 2001 teen flick Summer Catch, and Semisonic rode the wave touring various cities in and around the UK.

Wilson had spoken about doing more Semisonic music in the future but said, "The busy day-to-day life keeps pushing it further into the future." All About Chemistry would be their last studio release until reconvening for the You're Not Alone EP which they put out in 2020.

2017–2019
To commemorate the twentieth anniversary of their first album, Great Divide, the band reunited for a series of three shows in June 2017 – June 14 at a small club in St. Paul, and June 16–17 at First Avenue in Minneapolis. The band played Great Divide in its entirety.

In December 2017, the band played three more shows in the Twin Cities to commemorate the approaching 20th anniversary of their second album, Feeling Strangely Fine, performing the album in its entirety. In 2018, Feeling Strangely Fine was given a rerelease for the album's twentieth anniversary, including its first vinyl pressing. The anniversary edition included four songs not on the original album: "Long Way from Home", "I'm a Liar", "Beautiful Regret", and "Makin' a Plan".

In July 2019, Semisonic performed at Summerfest in Milwaukee and then at the Basilica Block Party in Minneapolis. During their 2017–2019 shows, the band performed some new, previously unreleased songs, including "Basement Tapes", "All It Would Take", and "You're Not Alone"

First Avenue
The band has been honored with a star on the outside mural of the Minneapolis nightclub First Avenue, recognizing performers that have played sold-out shows or have otherwise demonstrated a major contribution to the culture at the iconic venue. Receiving a star "might be the most prestigious public honor an artist can receive in Minneapolis", according to journalist Steve Marsh. Wilson and Munson's previous group, Trip Shakespeare, also has a star making them among the few musicians with multiple stars on the mural.

Reunions

The band reunited for a series of two shows on June 14, 2017, in St. Paul and June 16, 2017, in Minneapolis for the first time in nearly five years. The St. Paul show at a smaller venue served as a live rehearsal for the Minneapolis show at famed Minneapolis club First Avenue. The band followed similar setlists for the shows, playing the album Great Divide in its entirety with a few additional songs, including a live debut of the Wilson-penned "Basement Tapes". Semisonic played together again in December 2017 with a similar combination of St. Paul and Minneapolis shows, but added a second show at First Avenue. The set list for these shows was the Feeling Strangely Fine track list with some supplemental songs including live debuts of two songs.

In 2018, Feeling Strangely Fine was given a rerelease for the album's twentieth anniversary, including its first vinyl pressing.

On June 26, 2020, Semisonic released the single "You're Not Alone", their first new material in 19 years, and later released the full You're Not Alone EP on September 18, 2020.

The band played two gigs at First Avenue on January 27, 2023 and January 28, 2023 to celebrate the venue's 50th anniversary.

Semisonic will be supporting Barenaked Ladies from June 2, 2023 through June 26, 2023 on the Last Summer on Earth 2023 tour.

Discography

Studio albums

Live albums
One Night at First Avenue (2003)

EPs
Pleasure (demo) (1993)
Pleasure EP (1995)
You're Not Alone (2020)

Singles

Soundtracks and compilations

 Semisonic performed "Sugar, Sugar" with Mary Lou Lord on the 1995 tribute album Saturday Morning: Cartoons' Greatest Hits, produced by Ralph Sall for MCA Records.
 Semisonic contributed the title song for the 1999 Kevin Costner movie For Love of the Game.
 Multiple Semisonic songs were featured in episodes of the television sitcom Friends, with "Delicious" and "Closing Time" later being featured in the soundtrack albums Friends Again and Friends: The Ultimate Soundtrack respectively.
 "Over My Head", a bonus track on some editions of All About Chemistry, was used in the 2001 teen flick Summer Catch.
"Closing Time" appeared in the 2011 movie Friends with Benefits.
 In the fall of 2001, Semisonic contributed their cover of the Wings song, "Jet", for the Paul McCartney tribute CD Listen to What the Man Said.
 Wilson with Bic Runga contributed "Good Morning Baby" to the American Pie soundtrack in 1999.
 "F.N.T." was featured in the 1996 movie The Long Kiss Goodnight and the 1999 movie 10 Things I Hate About You.
 "Closing Time" was included in an episode of The Office. It was also featured in the season finale of The Real World: Seattle.

Other projects by members
Wilson took time out to do some solo projects and play tour dates around the Midwest in December. Munson joined Wilson's brother and former Trip Shakespeare frontman Matt Wilson to form a side project, The Flops, in 2001, though they were expected to make a final performance in early 2005. In 2009, John Munson and Matt Wilson reunited to form a new band The Twilight Hours. They have released two albums, Stereo Night (2009) and Black Beauty (2016), and have been touring.

In 2004, Slichter's book So You Wanna Be a Rock & Roll Star was published, detailing some of the experiences the group had while touring and attempting to get airplay on radio stations across the US.

In late spring of 2005, John Munson began playing in a new jazz trio, The New Standards, featuring Chan Poling of The Suburbs and Steve Roehm. This band plays new jazz renditions of "classic" songs.

In October 2007, Rick Rubin's label American Recordings released Wilson's solo album, Free Life, featuring collaborations with numerous artists including Munson and Slichter. The song "Cry" was the album's single.

References

External links

MTV.com artists biography
City Pages: Radio Killed the Rock & Roll Stars – book excerpt
An Interview with Dan Wilson, Part 1 (on creativity and the creative process)

Alternative rock groups from Minnesota
American post-grunge musical groups
American musical trios
MCA Records artists
Musical groups from Minnesota
Musical groups established in 1995
1995 establishments in Minnesota